Cheriyo Doctor is a 1991 Sri Lankan Sinhala romantic comedy film directed by Roy de Silva and produced by Thilak Atapattu for TK Films. It is the first film of Cheriyo film series, which continued with three more films in 1995 (Cheriyo Captain), 1996 (Cheriyo Darling) and 2002 (Cheriyo Holman). It stars Joe Abeywickrama, Sanath Gunathilake and Sabeetha Perera in lead roles along with Bandu Samarasinghe, Tennison Cooray and Freddie Silva. Music for the film is done by Somapala Rathnayake. It is the 734th Sri Lankan film in the Sinhala cinema.

Plot
Cheriyo Doctor, centering on the incidents occur within a mental hospital run by Professor. Incidents starts when Nurse Surangi falls in love with one of fake patient Chaminda Randenigala. After series of comedy incidents, Chaminda's friend Nalin also attended to the hospital with fake illness and Chaminda's realized that his sister Madhu falls in love with Nalin. However, Chaminda's mother Nayana Randenigala opposes their romantic behaviors and locked Madhu. With the help of hospital staff, Chaminda and Nalin fight against Nayana's thugs and win their fiancees.

Cast
 Joe Abeywickrama as Professor
 Sanath Gunathilake as Chaminda Randenigala
 Sabeetha Perera as Surangi
 Bandu Samarasinghe as Marmite
 Tennison Cooray as Hospital attendant
 Freddie Silva as Doctor Coco and Virindu singer  
 Nihal Silva as Doctor Ko
 Shashi Wijendra as Nalin
 Nadeeka Gunasekara as Madhu 
 Sumana Amarasinghe as Nayana Randenigala
 Cletus Mendis as Cleet
 Mark Samson as Mark
 Lilian Edirisinghe as Head nurse
 Teddy Vidyalankara as Chance's henchman
 Hugo Fernando as Patient
 Mabel Blythe as Mrs. Saparamadu
 Manel Chandralatha as Nurse
 Samanthi Lanarole as Nurse
 Nawanandana Wijesinghe as Patient
 Gothami Pathiraja as Dracula nurse
 M. V. Balan as Security guard
 Lionel Deraniyagala as Chance
 Jayalath Fernando as 'Thaddiya' guard
 Lakmal Fonseka as Crossdresser
 Vishaka Siriwardana as Nurse
 Sunil Bamunuarachchi
 Jinadasa Perera

Songs
The film consists with six songs.

References

1991 films
1990s Sinhala-language films
1991 comedy films
Sri Lankan comedy films